Angry Kisses is a 2000 Swiss drama film directed by Judith Kennel. It was entered into the 22nd Moscow International Film Festival where Maria Simon won the award for Best Actress.

Cast
 Jürgen Vogel as Pfarrer Bachmann
 Maria Simon as Lea
 Julia Jentsch as Katrin
 Gudrun Gabriel
 Verena Zimmermann
 Bernadette Vonlanthen
 Roswitha Dost
 Adina Vetter

References

External links
 

2000 films
2000 drama films
Swiss drama films
2000s German-language films
Swiss German-language films